Pakubuwono XI (also transliterated as Pakubuwana XI; February 1 1886 – June 1 1945) was the eleventh Susuhunan (ruler of Surakarta) during the Second World War – and during the Japanese occupation of Java.

In his capacity as the eleventh Susuhunan, Pakubuwono XI was an officer à la suite of the Royal Netherlands East Indies Army (KNIL). He was made a Major General of the KNIL on 15 April, 1939.

Heir apparent 
He was born as Raden Mas Ontoseno, he was the son of Pakubuwono X and his concubine, Kanjeng Raden Ayu Mandojoretno. Upon reaching adulthood, he was styled as Kanjeng Gusti Pangeran Haryo Hangabehi. He was crowned as Susuhunan Pakubuwana XI on 26 April, 1939.

The appointment of KGPH. Hangabehi as Pakubuwono XI wasn't without conflict, due to Pakubuwono X's preference to KGPH. Koesoemojoedo (Gusti Raden Mas Abimanjoe), KGPH. Hangabehi's younger brother, to succeed him. Moreover, from the Dutch colonial government's point of view, KGPH. Koesoemojoedo was a strong-personality Javanese nobleman who interested in the court's financial and administration affairs. In another side, KGPH. Hangabehi's position was also strong, mainly from majority of anti-Dutch court's elites. Pakubuwono X himself had more than 60 children. A wedging problem was that Pakubuwono X had no son from his two queen consorts. The eldest sons, KGPH. Hangabehi and KGPH. Koesoemojoedo, were born from concubines. In 1898, Pakubuwono X had actually intended to appoint KGPH. Koesoemojoedo as a crown prince although he was born 40 days after KGPH. Hangabehi's birth. However, Pakubuwono X abandoned his plan, and he chose KGPH. Hangabehi as the heir.
 
KGPH. Hangabehi was given many important positions, such as wedana tengen (chancellor) and Vice-Chairman of Raad Nagari, a royal advisory council. He was also tasked by his father to attend 40th jubilee of Queen Wilhelmina's coronation in the Netherlands.

Reign
In the late November 1938, Pakubuwono X was severely ill, and died 3 months later. On the advice of Parliament of the Netherlands, Governor-General Alidius Warmoldus Lambertus Tjarda van Starkenborgh Stachouwer chose KGPH. Hangabehi to succeed his father as Pakubuwono XI. Pakubuwono XI's coronation was accompanied by political contract which reduced Susuhunan's suzerainty, which mentioned that Pakubuwono XI would be deposed if he couldn't fulfill his obligation as determined in political contract, plus the withholding of royal expenditure budget dramatically.

Pakubuwono XI's reign was marked by difficult era, coincided with World War II. He also experienced the transfer of colonial government, from the Netherlands to Japan since 1942. The Japanese dubbed Surakarta Sunanate as Solo Koo. In Japanese colonial era, there was inflation which severed royal and nobility's finances. The Japanese also confiscated most of court's assets, which caused Pakubuwono XI fell ill. After his death on 1 June, 1939, he was succeeded by his very young son, styled Pakubuwono XII.

Family

Queen consorts
 Gusti Kanjeng Ratu Kentjana (died before his ascension)
 GKR. Pakubuwono

Concubines
 KRAy. Dajaresmi
 KRAy. Dajaningsih
 KRAy. Dajasoema
 KRAy. Dajaasmara
 KRAy. Dajaningrat.

Sons
 KGPH. Mangkoeboemi
 KGPH. Hangabehi
 KGPH. Prabuwijaya
 Gusti Pangeran Harya Bintara
 GPH. Natapura
 KGPH. Purbaya (later Pakubuwono XII)

Daughters
 GKR. Ajoe
 GKR. Bendara
 GKR. Tjandrakirana
 GRAy. Koesoemadartaja
 GKR. Kedaton

References

 Miksic, John N. (general ed.), et al. (2006)  Karaton Surakarta: A Look into the Court of Surakarta Hadiningrat, Central Java (First published: 'By the will of His Serene Highness Paku Buwono XII'. Surakarta: Yayasan Pawiyatan Kabudayan Karaton Surakarta, 2004) Marshall Cavendish Editions  Singapore  
 Purwadi. 2007. Sejarah Raja-Raja Jawa. Yogyakarta: Media Ilmu.

Burials at Imogiri
Susuhunan of Surakarta
1886 births
1945 deaths
People of the Dutch East Indies